Savoy Brown were a British blues rock band from London. Formed on February 24, 1965, the group was centred around guitarist and vocalist Kim Simmonds, who was originally joined by lead vocalist Brice Portius, bassist Ray Chappell, keyboardist Trevor Jeavons, harmonica player John O'Leary and drummer Leo Mannings. The band's final line-up included Simmonds on guitar and lead vocals along with bassist Pat DeSalvo and drummer Garnet Grimm, both of whom joined in 2009.

History

1965–1970
Kim Simmonds formed Savoy Brown in October 1965 with vocalist Brice Portius, bassist Ray Chappell, drummer Leo Mannings, keyboardist Trevor Jeavons and harmonica player John O'Leary. Shortly after the band's formation, Jeavons was replaced by Bob Hall. In 1966, the group released their first single, "I Tried". Early the next year, Martin Stone of the Action joined as a second guitarist, and a few months later O'Leary left after a dispute with manager Harry Simmonds. The remaining members recorded the group's debut album Shake Down, which was released in September 1967.

Shortly after the release of Shake Down, the band went through a series of personnel changes in quick succession. First, Portius was replaced by Chris Youlden; shortly thereafter, Stone and Chappell also left, with the bassist replaced by Fleetwood Mac founding member Bob Brunning; finally, Mannings was replaced by Hughie Flint (formerly of John Mayall & the Bluesbreakers), while guitarist "Lonesome" Dave Peverett also joined in place of the departed Stone. After recording one single, "Taste and Try, Before You Buy", Brunning and Flint were both fired and replaced in the new year by Rivers Jobe (formerly of Anon) and Bill Bruford, respectively. Bruford lasted only three shows, however, before he was dismissed for "fiddling around with the rhythm".

Bruford was replaced by Roger Earl. The new lineup released "Walking by Myself" in March 1968, followed by the band's second album Getting to the Point a few months later. In November, Jobe was fired and briefly replaced by a returning Bob Brunning; however, he did not want to commit full-time, and was replaced the next month by Tony "Tone" Stevens. The new lineup recorded Blue Matter and A Step Further in 1969, the latter of which marked the final studio contribution of Bob Hall – Simmonds and Youlden shared piano duties on the next album, Raw Sienna. In May 1970, shortly after its release, Youlden left Savoy Brown and Peverett took over lead vocals. The remaining four-piece released Looking In, before Peverett, Stevens and Earl all quit in December 1970 (they formed Foghat the next month).

1970–1976
Simmonds had reformed Savoy Brown by the end of 1970 with new vocalist Pete Scott, former Blodwyn Pig bassist Andy Pyle and drummer Ron Berg, and former Chicken Shack keyboardist Paul Raymond. In May 1971, after an American tour, Scott was replaced by Dave Walker of the Idle Race, while Pyle and Berg made way for Andy Silvester and Dave Bidwell, respectively, both former bandmates of Raymond in Chicken Shack. The new lineup released Street Corner Talking and Hellbound Train, before Silvester left in June 1972 for "personal reasons" and Pyle returned.

After recording Lion's Share, Walker left Savoy Brown in September 1972 to join Fleetwood Mac. He was replaced by Jackie Lynton. Partway through the recording of their next album Jack the Toad, Bidwell was also replaced by the returning Ron Berg. This lineup completed the album's recording, and its subsequent promotional tour, before Simmonds decided to disband the group again. He rebuilt the group with Hemlock members Miller Anderson (lead vocals, rhythm guitar), Jim Leverton (bass, backing vocals) and Eric Dillon (drums), before former Chicken Shack frontman Stan Webb joined on guitar in January 1974 upon the breakup of his group. The new lineup released Boogie Brothers in April and toured until July, before splitting up and leaving Simmonds to rebuild the band yet again.

By late 1974, Simmonds had brought back keyboardist/guitarist Paul Raymond and drummer Dave Bidwell, as well as adding new lead vocalist Dave Tedstone. This lineup toured the UK and Germany in early 1975, before Tedstone was dismissed and not replaced – Simmonds took over on lead vocals for the first time in the band's history. Bidwell left for a second time during the recording of Wire Fire and was replaced for the rest of the sessions by Tom Farnell; the album was released in October and a tour followed until December, after which Rae was also replaced by Ian Ellis. Skin 'n' Bone followed in April 1976, after which Raymond left in July to join UFO. After Raymond's departure, with the band reduced to a trio, Simmonds decided to take a break and placed Savoy Brown on hiatus.

1978–1992
In early 1978, Savoy Brown returned with Kim Simmonds, Ian Ellis and Tom Farnell joined on tour by an unknown keyboardist; however, the new member was dismissed before the band recorded its next album Savage Return, which credited only the trio. Following the album's release and promotional tour, Simmons relocated to the United States in 1978; he toured during 1979 and 1980 with a lineup including drummer/vocalist Richie Carmichael and a bassist known only as "D.C."(Don Cook), before introducing a new lineup of vocalist Ralph Morman (formerly of the Joe Perry Project), guitarist Barry Paul, drummer Keith Boyce (both formerly of Heavy Metal Kids), and bassist John Humphrey in the summer of 1980. This incarnation issued Rock 'n' Roll Warrior and Greatest Hits Live in 1981, before breaking up at the end of the year.

Savoy Brown was inactive for around two years, before returning in late 1983 with a lineup of Simmonds, vocalist/guitarist Andrew Gerome, bassist Stutz Bearcat and drummer Tommy Amato. The group continued touring during 1984, and was briefly renamed the Kim Simmonds Band. In 1985, Savoy Brown signed with Relix Records and introduced a new incarnation featuring vocalist/harmonica player Speedo Jones and bassist Chris Romanelli. Slow Train, a collection of acoustic recordings, was released in September 1986, shortly after which Simmonds introduced a new lineup with vocalist Jimmy Kunes, bassist Jim Dagnesi and drummer Al Macomber; early the next year, Kunes was replaced by a returning Dave Walker and Shmutza-Hideous joined on percussion (keyboards were handled by various guest performers).

Make Me Sweat was released in January 1988. Walker, Dagnesi and Macomber all remained for Kings of Boogie, issued in March 1989. For the album's tour, Simmonds and Walker were joined by bassist Lou Kaplan, drummer Pete Mendillo and keyboardist Rick Jewett, all members of roots rock band Mad Jack. Kaplan and Mendillo left in 1990 and were replaced by Loren Kraft and Steve Behrendt, respectively, while Jeff Adams joined on guitar. Walker left for a second time in September 1991. He was replaced by Pete McMahon and Phil McCormack. Around the same time, Andy Ramirez and Joe Pierleoni took over from Kraft and Behrendt.

1992–2022
Following the release of Let It Ride in 1992, Simmonds, McMahon, Ramirez and Pierleoni toured through to 1993. Jim Heyl and Dave Olson replaced Ramirez and Pierleoni for the 1994 album Bring It Home. During the second half of the 1990s, Savoy Brown was centred around Simmonds and bassist Nathaniel Peterson, both of whom shared lead vocal duties. The group went through a succession of drummers – first Al Cash, followed by T. Xiques and later Tom Compton. Following the album's release, Simmonds enlisted second guitarist David Malachowski (formerly of Shania Twain's band), bassist Gerry Sorrentino (formerly of Shemekia Copeland's band) and drummer Dennis Cotton (known for his work with Duke Robillard).

With Malachowski, Sorrentino and Cotton, Savoy Brown released studio album Strange Dreams in 2003 and live collection You Should Have Been There! in 2004. Malachowski left the band in 2005. Cotton followed later in the year and was replaced by Mario Staiano. This new trio issued Steel in 2007. In August 2009, Sorrentino was forced to leave the group due to illness, with Pat DeSalvo taking his place. Later in the year, Staiano was also replaced by Garnet Grimm, and Joe Whiting joined on lead vocals and saxophone. Voodoo Moon was released in 2011. Whiting left in late 2012. Simmonds returned to performing lead vocals, and since 2014 the group has released a slew of studio and live albums. Kim Simmonds died on 13 December 2022; the band disbanded shortly after his death.

Personnel

Last lineup

Past members

Timeline

Lineups

References

External links
Savoy Brown official website

Savoy Brown